Zhuosesia is a genus of moths in the family Sesiidae.

Species
Zhuosesia zhuoxiana Yang, 1977

References

Sesiidae